Strikeforce: Rousey vs. Kaufman was a mixed martial arts event held by Strikeforce. The event took place on August 18, 2012, at the Valley View Casino Center in San Diego, California. It was broadcast live on Showtime and Showtime Extreme.

Background 
The main event featured a Strikeforce Women's Bantamweight Championship bout between new titleholder Ronda Rousey and former champion Sarah Kaufman. The entire card consisted of nine sanctioned mixed martial arts bouts. The official weigh-ins, on August 17, were open to fans as reported by MMAjunkie.

Rousey appeared on Conan and on Showtime's "All Access: Ronda Rousey" to promote herself and her upcoming fight. She also appeared on the cover of ESPN's Body Issue. Rousey upped the hype at the official pre-fight press conference when she said "if I get her (Kaufman) in a choke I'm gonna hold on to it until she's actually dead..."

With the cancellation of Strikeforce's next two events, and their last event featuring only male fighters, this was the last Strikeforce card to feature bouts involving female fighters.

As he was absent from Strikeforce's last event due to a private family matter, this was the last Strikeforce card featuring Mauro Ranallo providing commentary on the televised broadcast.

Results

Salaries 
The disclosed fighter payroll for Strikeforce: Rousey vs. Kaufman was $368,000. Individual payouts are listed below. The numbers only include figures that Strikeforce disclosed to the state athletic commission; fight bonuses, sponsorship fees, and other unofficial bonuses were not disclosed.

Preliminary card 
Bobby Green: $16,000 ($8,000 to show, $8,000 to win)
Matt Ricehouse: $5,000
Germaine de Randamie: $15,000 ($7,500 to show, $7,500 to win)
Hiroko Yamanaka: $8,000
Adlan Amagov: $20,000 ($10,000 to show, $10,000 to win)
Keith Berry: $2,000
Miesha Tate: $38,000 ($19,000 to show, $19,000 to win)
Julie Kedzie: $5,000

Main card 
Ovince St. Preux: $34,000 ($17,000 to show, $17,000 to win)
T. J. Cook: $3,000
Anthony Smith: $6,000 ($3,000 to show, $3,000 to win)
Lumumba Sayers: $7,000
Tarec Saffiedine: $35,000 ($17,500 to show, $17,500 to win)
Roger Bowling: $10,000
Ronaldo Souza: $94,000 ($72, 000 to show, $22,000 to win)
Derek Brunson: $13,000

Main event 
Ronda Rousey: $40,000 ($20,000 to show, $20,000 to win)
Sarah Kaufman: $17,000

Viewers
According to Annie Van Tornhout, a Showtime Sports publicist, the event drew an average of 529,000 viewers for the live and delayed broadcast. As a result, the event became the most-watched Strikeforce card on Showtime this year and the sixth most-watched of all-time.

The broadcast peaked at 676,000 viewers for the main event, which is also the highest number this year for Strikeforce. In total, the Rousey vs. Kaufman bout drew 908,000 viewers, including Sunday's replay of the fight.

References

Rousey vs. Kaufman
2012 in mixed martial arts
Mixed martial arts in San Diego
2012 in sports in California
Events in San Diego